Ghislaine Marie Françoise Dommanget (13 October 1900 – 30 April 1991) was a French actress, and the Princess consort of Monaco from 1946 to 1949.

Early life
Dommanget was born in Reims, France, as the daughter of Colonel Robert Joseph Dommanget (1867–1957) and his wife, Marie Louise Meunier (1867–1957).

Personal life
In 1923, she was married to Paul Diey (1863–1931). After his death in 1931, she had a relationship with actor André Brulé. 

She broke up with Brulé and married the reigning Prince of Monaco, Louis II, on 24 July 1946 — the first bride of a member of the House of Grimaldi without a dowry.

Following Louis II's death on 9 May 1949, and the accession of her step-grandson, Rainier III, she became Dowager Princess of Monaco, a title she held until her death.

Notable published works

Honours
National honours
 : Dame Grand Cross of the Order of Saint-Charles (24 October 1946).
Foreign honours
 : 
 Knight of the Order of the Legion of Honour (25 June 1947).
 Commander of the Order of Public Health (14 July 1948).
 : Benemerenti Medal (8 January 1948).

References

|-

1900 births
1991 deaths
Actors from Reims
French film actresses
French expatriates in Monaco
Princesses of Monaco
House of Grimaldi
Burials at Passy Cemetery
Grand Crosses of the Order of Saint-Charles
Chevaliers of the Légion d'honneur
Duchesses of Valentinois
20th-century French actresses